Hollywood Dreams is a 2006 American comedy-drama film written and directed by Henry Jaglom. The film stars Tanna Frederick, Justin Kirk, David Proval, Karen Black, Eric Roberts, and Seymour Cassel.

Plot
Aspiring actress Margie Chizek (Frederick) seeks Hollywood stardom and finds rejection, romance, publicity and epiphanies along the way.

Sequel
The film spawned a sequel released in 2010 titled Queen of the Lot.

References

External links
 
 
 Review at The New York Times
 Review at Variety

2006 comedy-drama films
2006 films
American comedy-drama films
Films directed by Henry Jaglom
2006 comedy films
2000s English-language films
2000s American films